A checklist is a type of job aid used to reduce failure by compensating for potential limits of human memory and attention.

Checklist or check list may also refer to:

 Check List, a peer-reviewed, open access, online, scientific journal 
 "Checklist", a 2018 song by Normani and Calvin Harris from the EP Normani x Calvin Harris
 Check sheet, a form used to collect data in real time at the location where the data is generated

See also
 
 
 Check (disambiguation)
 List (disambiguation)
 Chequebook, or checkbook, a book of cheques and ledger list for those cheques
 Laundry list (disambiguation)
 Shopping list
 To-do list
 :Category:Checklists